Gregory is an unincorporated community and census-designated place (CDP) in Woodruff County, Arkansas, United States. It was first listed as a CDP in the 2020 census with a population of 43. Gregory has a post office with ZIP code 72059.

Education 
Public education for early childhood, elementary and secondary school students is provided by the Augusta School District, which leads to graduation from Augusta High School.

Landmarks 
The current post office is located on the west side of Arkansas Highway 33 at 20087 Highway 33 South.  It is adjacent to the former Gregory Store, now currently a part-time restaurant, which for many years along with the post office was the most prominent Gregory landmark.  The current store building was built in 1989 after fire destroyed the original Gregory Store location, which sat in the same approximate location for several years.  The immediate past Gregory post office location sits across the street, but has remained unoccupied for several years.  In addition to the Gregory Store and post office, two church buildings are among the area's landmarks.  The first is Gregory Baptist Church, where services are still held as of October 2013.  The church was founded in 1941, is a member of the Calvary Baptist Association, based in Judsonia, Arkansas, and is located at 20184 Highway 33 South (on the east side of Highway 33). Services begin at 10:00 AM each Sunday morning. Historic Reed Cemetery is located to the south of the church building along Highway 33.  Many of the headstones in the cemetery indicate burial dates from the early 1800s.  Additionally, Walnut Grove Baptist Church sits just around the corner from Gregory Baptist Church and adjacent to Reed Cemetery.  Walnut Grove church holds regular services as well.

Demographics

2020 census

Note: the US Census treats Hispanic/Latino as an ethnic category. This table excludes Latinos from the racial categories and assigns them to a separate category. Hispanics/Latinos can be of any race.

Notable people
Little Johnny Taylor, blues and soul singer

References

Unincorporated communities in Woodruff County, Arkansas
Unincorporated communities in Arkansas
Census-designated places in Arkansas